The First Congregational Church building, of Eugene, Oregon, is a former church building listed on the U.S. National Register of Historic Places.  It was built in 1925.  Also known as the Old Congregational Church and more recently as the Willcox Building, it includes Late 19th and 20th Century Revivals and Mediterranean Revival architecture.

It was added to the National Register of Historic Places in 1980.  Having ceased to be used as a church, the building was sold in 1956. It then served as a memorial chapel from 1956 to 1979.  After being sold again in 1979, to Associated Management, Inc., it was put to use for other activities.  It was renamed the Willcox Building, after the architect who designed it, Walter R. B. Willcox (1869–1947).

From 1980, the building was occupied by a theater known as the Bijou Art Cinema. The Bijou permanently closed in 2021.

According to its NRHP nomination, it "is significant for its architectural excellence. It is the best of the remaining local structures designed by Walter R. B. Willcox, a Northwest architect and educator of considerable renown, and considered to be his only ecclesiastic building in Oregon."

References

1925 establishments in Oregon
Buildings and structures in Eugene, Oregon
Churches completed in 1925
Churches on the National Register of Historic Places in Oregon
Congregational churches in Oregon
Mediterranean Revival architecture in Oregon
National Register of Historic Places in Eugene, Oregon